The Sanremo Music Festival 1989 was the 39th annual Sanremo Music Festival, held at the Teatro Ariston in Sanremo, province of Imperia, between 21 and 25 February 1989 and broadcast on Rai 1.

The show was presented by Rosita Celentano, Paola Dominguin, Danny Quinn e Gianmarco Tognazzi. Kay Sandvick and Clare Ann Matz hosted the segments from the Sanremo Casino where a number of foreign guests performed.

The winner of the Big Artists section were Fausto Leali and Anna Oxa with the song "Ti lascerò", and Mietta won the "Newcomers" section with the song "Canzoni".

Only in this edition it was introduced the "Emerging artists" category, whose members were selected through the television contest "Aspettando Sanremo" broadcast on Radio 1 and hosted by Claudio Lippi. The winner was Paola Turci with the song "Come bambini".

Participants and results

Big Artists

Emerging artists

Newcomers

Musical guests 
      
Ray Charles and Dee Dee Bridgewater
Charles Aznavour
Elton John
Boy George
Chris Rea
Johnny Clegg
Nick Kamen
Roachford
Tracy Spencer
Europe
Chico Buarque de Hollanda
Toni Childs
 Belen Thomas 
Depeche Mode
Sandie Shaw
Little Steven
Spagna
Cliff Richard
Kim Wilde
Tanita Tikaram
Simply Red
Ofra Haza
Joan Manuel Serrat
Tuck & Patti
Bros
Yazz

References 

Sanremo Music Festival by year
1989 in Italian music
1989 music festivals